Events from the year 1389 in India.

Events

Establishments

Births

Deaths

See also
 Timeline of Indian history

References

India